Riolama uzzelli is a species of lizard in the family Gymnophthalmidae. The species is endemic to Venezuela.

Etymology
The specific name, uzzelli, is in honor of American Herpetologist Thomas Marshall Uzzell, Jr. (born 1932).

Geographic range
R. uzzelli is found in the Venezuelan state of Amazonas.

Habitat

Reproduction
R. uzzelli is oviparous.

References

Further reading
Molina C, Seňaris JC (2003). "Una nueva especie del genero Riolama (Reptilia: Gymnophthalmidae) de las tierras altas del Estado Amazonas, Venezuela". Memoria de la Fundación la Salle de Ciencias Naturales 61 (155): 5–19. (Riolama uzzelli, new species). (in Spanish).
Recoder R, Prates I, Marques-Souza S, Camacho A, Sales Nunes PM, Dal Vechio F, Ghellere JM, McDiarmid RW (2020). "Lizards from the Lost World: two new species and evolutionary relationships of the Pantepui highland Riolama (Gymnophthalmidae)". Zoological Journal of the Linnean Society 190 (1): 271–297.
Rivas GA, Molina CR, Ugueto GN, Barrio-Amorós CL, Kok PJR (2012). "Reptiles of Venezuela: an updated and commented checklist". Zootaxa 3211: 1–64.

Riolama
Reptiles of Venezuela
Endemic fauna of Venezuela
Reptiles described in 2003
Taxa named by César R. Molina
Taxa named by Josefa Celsa Señaris
Fauna of the Tepuis